Putanga, also spelt Paranga, is a village in Apac, Uganda.

References

Populated places in Uganda
Apac District